List of digital video cameras with an image sensor larger than 2/3 inch and producing video in a horizontal resolution equal or higher than 1920 pixels.

Digital video cameras

Still cameras with video mode

See also
 List of 4K video recording devices

References 

Cameras by type
Digital movie cameras
Digital SLR cameras
Film and video technology